Elliott Forbes-Robinson (born October 31, 1943 in La Crescenta, California) is a road racing race car driver. He is known for his race wins and championships in many different series, including the American Le Mans Series (ALMS), Super Vee, Trans-Am Series, CanAm, IMSA GTU, and the World Challenge. He is known in NASCAR circles as a road course ringer. He is also a founder of the Legends Cars of 600 Racing and he designed their original car.

Racing career
SCCA

1970 ARRC National Championships C production. Porsche 914-6 fourth in C production
 
1972 VW Gold Cup Super Vee 4th place overall in points. 2 Wins Riverside and Portland International Raceway

1972 SCCA ARRC National Championships E Production. Porsche 914. Results Pole position, Track record, Overall win by over 30 seconds. DQ'd in post-race inspection.

1974 VW Gold Cup Super Vee championship. Seven victories and four finishes in fifth or better out of the 13 races he entered.

He was the 1982 champion of the Trans-Am Series.

Forbes-Robinson co-won the 1987 Grand Prix of Miami with Geoff Brabham. In 1988, he took over the driver's seat from car owner Rick Hendrick during the final NASCAR race at Riverside International Raceway.

In the mid-1990s he competed in SCCA, IMSA’s GTU, the Pikes Peak International Hillclimb, and the World Sportscar Championship.

In 1991 he drives with Robby and Johnny Unser the 24 Hours of Nürburgring for Porsche [911 Cup/ with Herbert Linge + Dr. K.R.Schuster].

In 1997 he won the overall win at the 24 Hours of Daytona.

In 1999 he repeated as the overall winner at the 24 Hours of Daytona. He won the inaugural ALMS championship with teammate Butch Leitzinger for Dyson Racing.

He won the SR Class at the 2000 24 Hours of Daytona, and finished fifth in the class’ points standings.

He finished seventh the 2001 SRP class points, with a second-place finish in eight starts.

He had three SRP starts in 2002. He finished third in his only SRP II start.
 
He was the 2003 Rolex Vintage Enduro Car champion.

He raced in The Rolex Series in 2004, and had eight Top-5 finishes in eleven races. He co-drove with Leitzinger. He raced in the No. 4 Pontiac-Crawford Daytona Prototype car for Howard-Boss Motorsports.

He continued his relationship with Boss Motorsports co-driving with Leitzinger in 2005. The duo won at Mid-Ohio, and had second-place finishes at the 24 Hours of Daytona, Homestead, and Laguna Seca in seven races. They finished fifth in the final series points.

Road racing career totals
He has had 51 major victories in his 30-year career. His victory co-driving with Butch Leitzinger at the 2004 Porsche 250 at Barber Motorsports Park  gave him victories in 5 consecutive decades.

Awards
He was inducted in the Motorsports Hall of Fame of America in 2006.

Racing record

SCCA National Championship Runoffs

Formula Super Vee

NASCAR
(key) (Bold – Pole position awarded by qualifying time. Italics – Pole position earned by points standings or practice time. * – Most laps led.)

Winston Cup Series

Daytona 500

24 Hours of Le Mans results

See also
Motorsports Hall of Fame of America
Legends car racing

References

External links
Pictures - A tribute to EFR

1943 births
24 Hours of Daytona drivers
24 Hours of Le Mans drivers
American Le Mans Series drivers
Atlantic Championship drivers
Rolex Sports Car Series drivers
Living people
NASCAR drivers
Racing drivers from California
Trans-Am Series drivers
World Sportscar Championship drivers
SCCA National Championship Runoffs winners
SCCA Formula Super Vee drivers
Formula Super Vee Champions
People from La Crescenta-Montrose, California